Trigrams are a special case of the n-gram, where n is 3. They are often used in natural language processing for performing statistical analysis of texts and in cryptography for control and use of ciphers and codes.

Frequency
Context is very important, varying analysis rankings and percentages are easily derived by drawing from different sample sizes, different authors; or different document types: poetry, science-fiction, technology documentation; and writing levels: stories for children versus adults, military orders, and recipes.

Typical cryptanalytic frequency analysis finds that the 16 most common character-level trigrams in English are:

Because encrypted messages sent by telegraph often omit punctuation and spaces, cryptographic frequency analysis of such messages includes trigrams that straddle word boundaries. This causes trigrams such as "edt" to occur frequently, even though it may never occur in any one word of those messages.

Examples
The sentence "the quick red fox jumps over the lazy brown dog" has the following word-level trigrams:

 the quick red
 quick red fox
 red fox jumps
 fox jumps over
 jumps over the
 over the lazy
 the lazy brown
 lazy brown dog

And the word-level trigram "the quick red" has the following character-level trigrams (where an underscore "_" marks a space):
 the
 he_
 e_q
 _qu
 qui
 uic
 ick
 ck_
 k_r
 _re
 red

References

Natural language processing
Computational linguistics
Speech recognition